Honor Elizabeth Kever (born October 14, 1948) is an American-born Canadian artist.

Kever was born in Boise, Idaho, and has been a Canadian citizen since 1975. She received a BFA from the University of Saskatchewan in 1977 and until 1988 she worked and exhibited as Honor Rogers.  She is married to Saskatoon writer David Carpenter (writer).  She is an active member of the Saskatoon arts community working as an instructor at several institutions including The Photographers Gallery, Saskatchewan School for the Arts, and Mendel Art Gallery, as well as working at the Photographers Gallery as an Exhibitions Coordinator. She currently resides in Saskatoon, Saskatchewan. 
Kever has participated in solo and group exhibitions and has illustrated a children's book.

Works

Public Collections 
Her work is held by Canada Council Art Bank, Mendel Art Gallery, Saskatchewan Arts Board, and University of Saskatchewan

Exhibits 
1.  Group Exhibitions

2002-03 Bequest, Art Gallery of Swift Current, Swift Current; Little Gallery, Prince Albert; Rosemont Gallery, Regina; Estevan Art Gallery and Museum, Estevan; Moose Jaw Museum and Gallery, Moose Jaw; Prairie Art Gallery, Grande Prairie.

2001 Exploring the Collections: The Admittance of Photography, Dunlop Gallery, Regina

1998 Saskatchewan Perspective: An Exhibition Celebrating the 50th Anniversary of the Arts Board, Mackenzie Art Gallery, Regina

Work, Home and Heaven:  Environment and Culture in the Work of Prairie Photographers 1918-1995, Mendel Art Gallery, Saskatoon

1994 Alternative Nature, Mendel Art Gallery

Women And, Snelgrove Gallery, Saskatoon

1992 My City, Kenderdine Gallery, Saskatoon

1989-90 Between Time and Place:  Contemporary Saskatchewan Photography, Photographers Gallery, Saskatoon; Toronto Photographers Workshop, Toronto

1988 Making Space Presentation House, North Vancouver, Mercer Union, Toronto

Signs, Signals and Symbols Mendel Art Gallery

1986 Out of Saskatchewan, Expo '86, Vancouver

1981 Recent Acquisitions, Mendel Art Gallery

1980 2nd National Exhibition of Works on or of Paper of Clay, Memphis State Univ. Art Gallery, Memphis, TN

Miami International Print Biennial, Miami, FL

1979  Rockford International Print Exhibition, Rockford, IL

1978 1st Canadian Biennale of Prints and Drawings, Alberta College of Art Gallery, Calgary 
Walls

Book Illustration 
She illustrated The Stonking Steps: A Journey through Ing-ong-ung.  Sample illustrations are on the author's webpage.

References

External links 

 ARTSask 
 Aretefacts Canada

1948 births
Living people
Artists from Idaho
20th-century Canadian women artists
20th-century Canadian artists
21st-century Canadian women artists
21st-century Canadian artists
People from Boise, Idaho
University of Saskatchewan alumni